Wacław Paprocki (died 1643) was a Roman Catholic prelate who served as Auxiliary Bishop of Włocławek (1639–1643) and Titular Bishop of Margarita (1639–1643).

Biography
On 11 Apr 1639, he was appointed during the papacy of Pope Urban VIII as Auxiliary Bishop of Włocławek and Titular Bishop of Margarita.
On 18 Sep 1639, he was consecrated bishop by Maciej Łubieński, Bishop of Włocławek. 
He served as Bishop of Włocławek until his death in 1643.

References

External links and additional sources
 (for Chronology of Bishops) 
 (for Chronology of Bishops)  
 (for Chronology of Bishops) 
 (for Chronology of Bishops)  

17th-century Roman Catholic bishops in the Polish–Lithuanian Commonwealth
Bishops appointed by Pope Urban VIII
1643 deaths